FL2, FL-2, or similar may refer to:
 FL2 (Lazio regional railways)
 Florida State Road 2, two east–west highways in the U.S. state of Florida
 Florida's 2nd congressional district, a congressional district in the U.S. state of Florida
 Food & Liquor II, the fourth album by American conscious rapper Lupe Fiasco
 Football League Two, the third-highest division of The Football League, and fourth-highest division overall in the English football league system
 Football League 2 (Greece), the third highest professional football league in Greece
 A model of the Chinese Silkworm missile